Turina is a surname. Notable people with the surname include:

Ivan Turina (1980–2013), Croatian footballer
Joaquín Turina (1882–1949), Spanish classical composer
José Luis Turina (born 1952), Spanish composer
Luciana Turina (born 1946), Italian singer, actress and television personality
Marko Turina (born 1937), Croatian cardiac surgeon